Xiang Zhuang ( 206 BC) was a younger cousin of Xiang Yu, the "Hegemon-King of Western Chu". He fought on Chu's side as a military general during the Chu–Han Contention (206–202 BC), a power struggle for supremacy over China between Xiang Yu and Liu Bang (Emperor Gao), the founder of the Han dynasty. Little is known about Xiang Zhuang, except for his role at the Feast at Hong Gate in 206 BC.

Family background
Xiang Zhuang was a younger cousin of Xiang Yu, and a grandson of Xiang Yan. Xiang Yu and Xiang Zhuang were raised by their uncle, Xiang Liang. Xiang Zhuang was versed in many types of martial arts and specialised in using swords.

Feast at Hong Gate

The only mention of Xiang Zhuang in historical records was about his role in the Feast at Hong Gate in 206 BC. Liu Bang had just overthrown the Qin dynasty and captured the Qin heartland of Guanzhong. According to an earlier promise by King Huai II of Chu, Liu Bang would become "King of Guanzhong". However, Xiang Yu was dissatisfied that Liu Bang had beaten him in the race to Guanzhong and wanted to kill Liu.

Acting on the advice of Fan Zeng, Xiang Yu lured Liu Bang into a trap under the pretext of inviting Liu to attend a banquet at Hong Gate. However, during the feast, Xiang Yu became reluctant to kill Liu Bang and paid no attention to Fan Zeng's hints to take action. Fan Zeng left the feast, called for Xiang Zhuang, and told him, "Our lord is too soft hearted. You go in, pretend to offer to perform a sword dance, and find an opportunity to kill the Duke of Pei (Liu Bang). If not, all of you will become his captives in future." Xiang Zhuang followed Fan Zeng's instructions and attempted to thrust his sword at Liu Bang on numerous instances.

Xiang Bo, another uncle of Xiang Yu and Xiang Zhuang, stood up and offered to join in the performance. Xiang Bo prevented Xiang Zhuang from killing Liu Bang by blocking Xiang Zhuang or shielding Liu with his body whenever Xiang Zhuang thrust his sword towards Liu. Xiang Yu eventually stopped both of them and ordered them to return to their seats.

This incident became the origin of a Chinese idiom, Xiang Zhuang performs a sword dance, his target is actually the Duke of Pei. (項莊舞劍, 意在沛公). This saying is used to describe a situation where one does something to disguise an attack on another person.

References
 Sima Qian. Records of the Grand Historian, Volume 7.

Chu–Han contention people